Perburidava was a Dacian town.

See also 

 Dacian davae
 List of ancient cities in Thrace and Dacia
 Dacia
 Roman Dacia

References

 

Dacian towns